Odysseus Unbound is a 2005 book by Robert Bittlestone, with appendices by the philologist James Diggle and the geologist John Underhill.  The book investigates the location of Homer's Ithaca, arguing that Paliki, a peninsula of Kefalonia, was an island at the time of the Trojan War, and that it was the island referred to as Ithaca in the Odyssey.

The accuracy of Homer's geography has been disputed since antiquity, and Bittlestone's book is one of several published by non-academic authors in the 1990s and 2000s that attempts to identify Homer's Ithaca based on the geographical evidence given in the Odyssey.  Bittlestone's argument that Paliki should be identified with Homer's Ithaca has received favourable reviews, with Mary Beard considering that there is "a very fair chance indeed" that he is correct, and Peter Green calling it "almost certainly correct".

However, reviewers criticised the hyperbolic claims made for the book.  G. L. Huxley and Christina Haywood both criticised Odysseus Unbound for not taking the argument that Homer's Ithaca was the same island as modern Ithaca seriously enough, and Huxley argues that even if Bittlestone's case that Paliki was once a separate island from Kefalonia is accepted, the book does not prove that it is the location of Homer's Ithaca.  Haywood concludes that Bittlestone "was carried too far by his enthusiasm", while Beard, though convinced by the argument that Paliki was an island in the Mycenaean period, concludes that "the end of the book descends into fantasy", and criticises Bittlestone for his excessive concern with speculatively identifying every geographical feature of Ithaca mentioned in the Odyssey with a real location on Paliki.

References

Works cited

External links 
Odysseus Unbound website; Odysseus Unbound discussion forum
James Diggle, Emeritus Professor of Greek and Latin, Cambridge University
Professor John Underhill, Chair of Exploration Geoscience and Chief Scientist, Shell Centre for Exploration Geoscience, Heriot-Watt University, Edinburgh

Odyssey
Ithaca
Cephalonia
Hypotheses
2005 non-fiction books
Ancient Greek geography
Homeric scholarship